Minolia sakya is a species of sea snail, a marine gastropod mollusk in the family Solariellidae.

Description

Distribution
This marine species occurs off Japan.

References

 Nomura, S. (1940): Molluscan fauna of the Moniwa shell beds exposed along the Natori-gawa in the vicinity of Sendai, Miyagi Prefecture. Sci. Rept. Tohoku Imp. Univ. Sendai, [2] 21:1-46, pls. 1–3.
 Yokoyama, M. (1931): Tertiary mollusca from Iwaki. Jour. Fac. Sci. Imp. Univ. Tokyo, sec. 2, vol.3, pt.4, pp. 197–204, pls.12,13
 Makiyama, J. (1959): Matajiro Yokoyama's Tertiary fossils from various localities in Japan. Part lI. Palaeontological Society of Japan, Special Papers, no.5, pp. 1–4, pls.58-86

sakya
Gastropods described in 1940